Quarré-les-Tombes is a commune in the Yonne department in Bourgogne-Franche-Comté in north-central France.

Population

Geography
The commune is located in the Morvan between the valleys of the Cure and Trinquelin. It is located on a granite hilltop of 450 meters altitude, which exposes the village to the northern winds and cold temperatures

The commune is located at a crossroads of these routes:

Avallon to St. Brisson,
de Rouvray to Lormes
Quarré to Cussy-les-Forges
Quarré to Châtel Censoir

The commune has 37 hamlets.

Hamlets
Hamlets of archaeological or historical interest are:
 Champlois whose large pavilion was a feudal manor.
 The Gorge, which had a mansion in 1280 (owner Jean de Roilly).
 Villiers-les Pautots whose name comes from a Roman villa and the family nickname.
 Velars-le-Comte is of Roman origin (tiles, medals and statues recovered). In 1325 it belonged to Guyot of Veillart.
 Les Iles-Ménéfriers  is known mainly for the accumulation of rocks called Roche des Fées.
 Les Mathieux housed a chapel dedicated to St. Eptade until 1667 .
 Au Moulin-Colas has remnants of Roman buildings.

History
In the seventh century, the village was named Quarreia, then was called Quarée until the eighteenth century. The current name of town comes from the large number of empty stone coffins ("tombes") in the graveyard surrounding the church.

Quarré, formerly Careacum, belonged to Corbon, Lord of Corbigny, who bequeathed it to his son in 706 at the Abbey of Flavigny.

In the eleventh century, the village was owned by the Sires de Chastellux, Counts of Quarré. The castle was built in 1863.

The church has undergone several reconstructions including one in the fifteenth century.  The chair and bench are carved in the style of Louis XIII.

See also
Communes of the Yonne department
Parc naturel régional du Morvan

References

Communes of Yonne